Adelobotrys panamensis is a species of plant in the family Melastomataceae. It is endemic to the mountains of El Copé in the Coclé province of Panama.  It is threatened by habitat loss.

References

Endemic flora of Panama
Melastomataceae
Critically endangered plants
Taxonomy articles created by Polbot